Adriano Facchini (born 12 March 1983) is a Brazilian professional footballer who plays as a goalkeeper.

Club career
Facchini was born in Xaxim, Santa Catarina. After playing youth football with Santos FC, he competed exclusively in his country's lower leagues. In 2009, aged 26, he moved to Portugal and signed for C.F. União, spending two years in the third division.

In the summer of 2011, Facchini continued in the country and joined Primeira Liga side Gil Vicente FC, penning a three-year contract. He made his debut in the competition on 12 August in a 2–2 home draw against S.L. Benfica, and was the undisputed starter for the Barcelos team during his spell.

On 1 July 2015, after suffering relegation to the second tier, Adriano left the club and signed a one-year deal with Kardemir Karabükspor.

Honours
Aves
Taça de Portugal: 2017–18

References

External links

1983 births
Living people
Brazilian people of Italian descent
Sportspeople from Santa Catarina (state)
Brazilian footballers
Association football goalkeepers
Campeonato Brasileiro Série B players
Campeonato Brasileiro Série C players
Associação Atlética Portuguesa (Santos) players
Jabaquara Atlético Clube players
Comercial Futebol Clube (Ribeirão Preto) players
Boavista Sport Club players
América Futebol Clube (RN) players
Primeira Liga players
Liga Portugal 2 players
Segunda Divisão players
C.F. União players
Gil Vicente F.C. players
C.D. Nacional players
C.D. Aves players
C.D. Cova da Piedade players
U.D. Vilafranquense players
Süper Lig players
TFF First League players
Kardemir Karabükspor footballers
Giresunspor footballers
Saudi Professional League players
Al Batin FC players
Brazilian expatriate footballers
Expatriate footballers in Portugal
Expatriate footballers in Turkey
Expatriate footballers in Saudi Arabia
Brazilian expatriate sportspeople in Portugal
Brazilian expatriate sportspeople in Turkey
Brazilian expatriate sportspeople in Saudi Arabia